Once Upon a Honeymoon is a 1956 American short musical fantasy film sponsored by Bell Telephone. It was directed by Gower Champion, and stars Virginia Gibson, Ward Ellis, Alan Mowbray, Chick Chandler, Veronica Pataky and Russell Hicks. The film was sponsored by Bell Telephone to promote the newly introduced colored telephone sets that better compliment modern home decor of the time. The Western Electric Model 500 desk telephone and it's wall version the Model 554 are featured in a variety of colors.

After Once Upon a Honeymoon was featured and mocked on a 1996 episode of Mystery Science Theater 3000, the short has gained a cult following. It is in the public domain. Clips were also shown in The Telephone episode of The Secret Life of Machines.

Plot
The film begins with a group of angels who are having a conference on Cloud Seven. The Angel Chief (Russell Hicks) has called the conference to talk about a newly married couple, Jeff (Ward Ellis) and Mary (Virginia Gibson), who have been trying to go on honeymoon but are repeatedly forced to postpone due to Jeff's work commitments as a songwriter. The couple's guardian angel, Wilbur (Chick Chandler), is sent down to Earth to help Jeff write a new song for an upcoming musical so he and Mary can finally leave on their honeymoon.

While Jeff struggles to write a new song, Mary daydreams about a new home. With the help of Wilbur, Mary imagines what it would be like to have the latest household products, including telephones provided by Bell. Wilbur then helps Jeff come up with a new song called "A Castle in the Sky", allowing the couple to finally leave on their much anticipated honeymoon.

Cast

 Virginia Gibson as Mary
 Ward Ellis as Jeff
 Chick Chandler as Wilbur the guardian angel
 Alan Mowbray as Gordon, Jeff's Boss
 Veronica Pataky as Sonya
 Russell Hicks as the Chief Angel

See also
List of American films of 1956
List of films about angels
Design for Dreaming

External links

1956 short films
1956 films
1950s independent films
1950s musical fantasy films
American independent films
American musical fantasy films
American short films
Films about angels
Films directed by Gower Champion
Sponsored films
1950s English-language films
1950s American films